Yoelbi Luis Quesada Fernández (born August 4, 1973, in Trinidad, Sancti Spíritus) is a Cuban athlete competing mostly in triple jump.

Career
He has an Olympic bronze medal, and became world champion in 1997 with a personal best jump of 17.85m.

Personal best
Triple jump: 17.85 m (wind: +0.9 m/s) –  Athens, 8 August 1997

Competition record

References

External links

Picture: Yoelbi Quesada, world champion in triple jump in 1997
 

1973 births
Living people
Cuban male triple jumpers
Athletes (track and field) at the 1991 Pan American Games
Athletes (track and field) at the 1995 Pan American Games
Athletes (track and field) at the 1999 Pan American Games
Athletes (track and field) at the 2003 Pan American Games
Athletes (track and field) at the 1992 Summer Olympics
Athletes (track and field) at the 1996 Summer Olympics
Athletes (track and field) at the 2000 Summer Olympics
Athletes (track and field) at the 2004 Summer Olympics
Olympic bronze medalists for Cuba
Olympic athletes of Cuba
People from Trinidad, Cuba
Pan American Games gold medalists for Cuba
Pan American Games bronze medalists for Cuba
Pan American Games medalists in athletics (track and field)
World Athletics Championships medalists
Medalists at the 1996 Summer Olympics
Olympic bronze medalists in athletics (track and field)
Universiade medalists in athletics (track and field)
Goodwill Games medalists in athletics
Central American and Caribbean Games gold medalists for Cuba
Competitors at the 1993 Central American and Caribbean Games
Competitors at the 1998 Central American and Caribbean Games
Universiade gold medalists for Cuba
World Athletics Championships winners
Central American and Caribbean Games medalists in athletics
Medalists at the 1997 Summer Universiade
Medalists at the 1999 Summer Universiade
Competitors at the 1998 Goodwill Games
Medalists at the 1991 Pan American Games
Medalists at the 1995 Pan American Games
Medalists at the 1999 Pan American Games
Medalists at the 2003 Pan American Games